Prieska is a town on the south bank of the Orange River, in the province of the Northern Cape, in western South Africa. It is located on the southern bank of the Orange River, 130 km north-west of Britstown and 75 km south-east of Marydale.

History
It developed from a place to which farmers migrated when the pans were full, after rains. It was originally named Prieschap, the name is derived from Korana and means ‘place of the lost she-goat’. It was administered by a village management board from 1882 and attained municipal status in 1892. In 2011 the town had a population of 14,246.

Many residents, historically, worked at the nearby Koegas mine which extracted and processed blue asbestos.

The town is 240 km south of Kimberley and lies on the R357 road.

Notable natives and residents 

 Elaine Vivier – Mensa IQ result score of 194
 Dr Eugene Ebrahim 'Manelisi' Bosman - Distinguished the township of E'thembeni, meaning, place of hope, by becoming the first Black Doctor in town. Not only in the town but bordering district towns. A first in the history of Gariep High School which is a semi developed school.
 Gert Thys - marathon runner
 Dricky Beukes - writer

References

External links

Prieska's website

Populated places established in 1882
Populated places in the Siyathemba Local Municipality
Karoo